A number of schooners were named Elisabeth, including:

, a Danish schooner wrecked in 1920
, a German schooner that was sold in 1935

Ship names